Stage Boom (Chinese: 爆裂舞台; pinyin: bào liè wǔ tái) was a 2021 Chinese music talent survival reality show that was broadcast on iQiyi from August 5 to October 22, 2021. The show is led by Han Hong, gathering ten talented female musicians - Lexie Liu, Shan Yichun, Song Yuqi, An Qi, Lu Keran, Vava, Wu Xuanyi, Yamy, Chen Zhuoxuan, Zhou Jieqiong - who have already debuted but lack a chance on stage. Together, they create top-notch and epic stage performances. The Boom girls will compete through battles. In the end, one “Boom Icon” will be determined and given the top resources in the industry.

Mentors

Boom Girls 

 Color Key

Notes 
*Resurrected in Episode 10

**Eliminated in Episode 5

***Eliminated in Episode 7

Episodes

Episode 1 (5 August 2021)

90 Seconds Initial Stage Performance 
For the initial stage performance, the Boom girls will each have 90 seconds to perform a song. After every performance, the rest of the girls will rate the performances by raising their hands to signal that they liked the performance.

An Qi and Yamy, having gotten the most likes, had the benefit of deciding the other girls' part of the song "VVS", which would be the theme song for the show. It will also be part of their first mission.

Episode 2 (12 August 2021, 13 August 2021)

VVS Mission 
For this mission, the Boom girls will be given 12 hours to finish practising the theme song and film a one-take music video for the song.

The final result of the mission will decide who get to perform on the stage for the first competition, which will only have a total of nine performances.

Episode 3 (20 August 2021)

First Competition Stage 
After the VVS mission, the Boom girls voted for who they thought did the worst during the mission. Shan Yichun received the most votes, and was thus unable to perform on stage for first competition. Instead, she will have to perform in the Boom Base.

For this competition, two Boom girls will battle each other. They are to choose their opponents; whoever have the most challengers will have priority in choosing their challenger. There will also be no elimination this round.

Episode 4 (27 August 2021)

First Competition Stage

Quiz Stage 
For this mission, the Boom girls will work in pairs. The pairs will also collaborate in the next competition. The five winners of the first competition had the benefit of choosing their partners. Zhou Jieqiong and Betty Wu, both of whom lost the competition and were the remaining girls left unpicked, were grouped together automatically.

The pairs will have four hours to prepare a short performance for the song "It's The Time". They are given three versions of the songs to choose from, which are Version A—dance version, Version B—rock version, and Version C—rap version.

After every performance, the performing pair will be assessed by the mentors based on the completeness of the performance, the cooperation between the pair and their personal breakthrough. The final result of the mission will decide which pairs get to perform on the stage for the second competition, which will only have a total of four performances.

Episode 5 (3 September 2021)

Second Competition Stage 
After the quiz stage, it is decided that Song Yuqi and Vava's pair will be not perform on stage. Instead they will perform in the Boom Base.

This competition will be the first elimination round. After every performance, the on-site voters will be able to vote for either a single, both or none of the girls in the pair. The total individual votes of each girl will then be added up to form the total team votes. The two lowest-ranking pairs will be eliminated.

After the competition, the two lowest-ranking pairs came out to be Zhou Jieqiong and Betty Wu's pair, and Song Yuqi and Vava's pair. Thus, they are eliminated. However, it is revealed that the girl with the highest individual votes within the two lowest-ranking pairs will not be eliminated, so Song Yuqi avoided elimination.

Episode 6 (10 September 2021)

Mini Mission 

For this mission, the Boom girls will have two hours to search for and record audio samples, which will be used as background audio for a short recorded story by the theme "A Departure". They will then be judged by a group of producers based on their imagination and influence.

The five highest-ranking girls had the benefit of choosing their theme for the next competition. The two remaining girls will have to work with two of the other girls. An Qi was chosen to work with Chen Zhuoxuan, while Song Yuqi was chosen to work with Lexie Liu. The selection of the theme also reveals the guests that will be collaborating with the girls. The guests are Second Hand Rose—"visual rock", Bibi Zhou—"lone wolf", IXFORM - Luo Yizhou—"national dance youth", THE9 - Snow Kong—"sexy, sweet and cool", and Cai Guoqing—"vintage modern".

Episode 7 (17 September 2021)

Third Competition (Guest Collaboration) Stage 

This competition will be the second elimination round. The lowest-ranking group will be eliminated.

After the competition, the lowest-ranking group came out to be Lexie Liu and Song Yuqi's group. Therefore, they are both eliminated.

Episode 8 (24 September 2021)

Character Mission 
The next competition will include a musical show by the theme "Main Character", which the girls will collaborate.

For the musical show, each girl is to choose a given role. The roles available are Xiao Mai—a martial arts coach, Mi Guoguo—an amusement park clown, Ling Kongjing— a pilot, Liao Xiaobei—a paralegal, Shang Ya—an IT maniac, and Li Man—a fashion editor-in-chief. To determine who will have the main role in the musical, they will have to perform the song demo of their corresponding roles. They will then be judged by a group of producers based on their completion and performance. The girl with the highest score will have the main role. If a role is picked by multiple girls, the girl with the highest score will keep the role, while the other girl(s) will have to pick another role.

An Qi, having gotten the highest score, got the main role for the musical. Chen Zhuoxuan and Lu Keran both picked the role of Liao Xiaobei. Since Chen Zhuoxuan received a higher score, Lu Keran had to choose another role.

Fourth Competition Stage 
This competition will be the third elimination round. The two lowest-ranking girls will be eliminated.

This competition is divided into two segments. The first segment is a musical show by the theme "Main Character", which the girls will collaborate. After the performance, the on-site voters will be able to vote a single girl who they think performed the best. The second segment is a solo show. The individual scores of each round will be totaled up to give the final results for the girls.

Episode 9 (1 October 2021)

Fourth Competition Stage 
For the solo show, it is revealed that a mystery guest will also perform on stage. One girl will be able to battle with the mystery guest. If the girl wins, she will automatically advance into the finals. However, if she loses, she will be eliminated. As every girl decided to battle the mystery guest, it became up to the mystery guest to choose her opponent. The mystery guest is revealed to be Meng Jia, who decided to battle Yamy.

After the competition, it is revealed that Yamy has lost to Meng Jia. Thus, she is eliminated. Chen Zhuoxuan and Lu Keran both tied for the last place. Thus, another round of voting was conducted by the mentors to reevaluate their performance. In the end, Lu Keran received a lower score, and therefore was eliminated.

Episode 10 (8 October 2021)

Fifth Competition Stage 
This competition will be the last before the finals. Three previously eliminated girls will be resurrected for a chance to enter the finals. The resurrected girls are Vava, Lexie Liu and Song Yuqi.

This competition is divided into 3 segments. The first segment is known as the Qualifying Race. This segment will be a competition between the three girls who won the previous competition. The two highest-ranking girls will advance to the finals, while the remaining girl will move on to the last segment.

Shan Yichun received the lowest score. Therefore she will move on to the last segment, while An Qi and Chen Zhuoxuan will advance to the finals.

The second segment is known as the Breakout Round. This segment will be a competition between the three returning girls. The highest-ranking girl will move on to the last segment, while the two remaining girls will be eliminated.

Lexie Liu received the highest score. Therefore she will compete with Shan Yichun in the last segment, while Vava and Song Yuqi are eliminated.

The last segment is known as the Same Song Ultimate Battle. For this segment, the lowest-ranking girl in the Qualifying Race and the highest-ranking girl in the Breakout Round will both perform the song "Wolves" separately. The winner will advance to the finals, while the loser will be eliminated.

Lexie Liu received a higher score. Therefore she will advance to the finals, while Shan Yichun is eliminated.

Episode 11 (15 October 2021) 
After the 3 remaining Boom girls are finished with their rehearsal for the finals, they are reunited with the rest of the girls that have been eliminated (exclu. Betty Wu, Shan Yichun).

It is also announced that the Boom girls will all be performing "VVS" together for the opening stage of the finals.

Discography

Singles

References 

2021 Chinese television series debuts
Singing talent shows
Chinese reality television series
IQIYI original programming